Jeremiah Smith Boies De Veber (November 7, 1829 – June 18, 1908) was a Canadian politician and businessman.

He was born in Saint John, New Brunswick, Canada. The son of L.H. De Veber, he was educated in Saint John and entered his father's mercantile firm. De Veber married Elizabeth Isley in 1856. He was a director of the Bank of New Brunswick and the Rivière-du-Loop Railway.

He was elected to the House of Commons of Canada on December 1, 1873, as a Member of the Liberal Party of Canada to represent the riding of the City of St. John and re-elected on January 22, 1874, and defeated on September 17, 1878. He was a member of the Liberal Party caucus from December 1, 1873, to August 16, 1878.

De Veber was also mayor of Saint John from 1885 to 1887 and served as treasurer for Saint John County from 1887 to 1908.

References 

Canadian businesspeople
Members of the House of Commons of Canada from New Brunswick
Liberal Party of Canada MPs
Colony of New Brunswick people
1830 births
1908 deaths
Mayors of Saint John, New Brunswick
Place of death missing